

Pink Bay  is a bay in the Australian state of South Australia and is located at the east end of Dudley Peninsula on Kangaroo Island overlooking Backstairs Passage in the gazetted locality of Willoughby  about  south of the state capital of  Adelaide and about  east of Penneshaw.

Description
Pink Bay is described as "a narrow, V-shaped bay" with a "40 m pocket of sand wedged inside."  It opens into Moncrieff Bay, a larger bay occupying the waters between Cape St Albans in the north and Cape Willoughby in the east. The coastline on either side of Pink Bay is "predominantly composed of steep, 100 m high vegetated bluffs."

Its sandy beach is reported as being an unpatrolled swimming beach by Surf Life Saving Australia (SLSA) who considers it to be ‘least hazardous’ and that "it faces north and is somewhat protected, but does receive low swell."  While the SLSA advises that most visitors to nearby Cape Willoughby come to "view the scenery and visit the lighthouse, with little use of the beaches," Sea Dragon Lodge, described as "a luxury boutique retreat" and  located on land surrounding Pink Bay advises on its website that the beach has "private access."

Its name is derived from "the pink colouring in the local granite."

History
Pink Bay was used as an access point by the South Australian Marine Board for goods and personnel for the Cape Willoughby Lighthouse from the early 1880s.

The property surrounding Pink Bay was originally leased and farmed by Tony Ebert from 1900 until 1918 when it was bought by Annie Louise Lashmar.  It remained in the Lashmar family until 1998 when it was bought by Mike and Cherry Hobbs who planted many trees to revegetate the cleared farmland.  In 2008 it was sold to Sea Dragon Lodge.

Flora and fauna

Pink Bay has a diversity of fish life including: King George Whiting, Silver Whiting, Flathead, Salmon, Tommy Ruffs, Mullet, Blue Throated Wrasse, Squid, Yellowtail Kingfish & various sharks.

Protected area status
As of late 2012, the waters adjoining its shoreline are within a habitat protection zone in the protected area known as the Encounter Marine Park.

References 

Bays of South Australia
Dudley Peninsula
Backstairs Passage